Selective schools in New South Wales, Australia are government high schools operated by the New South Wales Department of Education that accept their students based upon their academic merit.

Each year, approximately 15,000 Year 6 students across the state of New South Wales optionally undertake the Selective High School Placement Test to seek one of the 3,600 places offered for first-year entry into selective high schools. For Year 8 to Year 12 entry into selective schools, students do not take an external test, however they can apply directly to a school for entry. The application package is standard to all government selective schools, with internal selection committees considering applications each year in August–September.

History
The first government selective high schools in NSW were established in the late 19th and early 20th century. The selective school system at the turn of the 20th century included both schools newly established as selective schools, and older schools with selective entry that were brought into the system. The oldest selective schools included Bathurst High School, Fort Street High School, Goulburn High School and Sydney High School (now Sydney Boys High School and Sydney Girls High School). Many of the oldest selective schools in NSW have always been selective since establishment, including Fort Street (1849), Sydney Boys and Sydney Girls (1883), North Sydney Girls High School (1914), North Sydney Boys High School (1915), Hurlstone Agricultural High School (1959) and James Ruse Agricultural High School (1959).

Before World War II, most of the state's government high schools were selective. In 1957, a government report recommended the conversion of selective schools to comprehensive schools, reflecting changes in education philosophy. As a result, from the early 1960s, most selective schools were converted to comprehensive schools. The conversion was resisted by parents and influential alumni of especially inner-city selective schools such as Fort Street. As a result, a small number of selective schools survived the reforms: Fort Street, Sydney Boys, Sydney Girls, North Sydney Boys, North Sydney Girls, James Ruse and Hurlstone. However, in 1988, the NSW government began increasing the number of selective schools and also made an important reform, abolishing catchment restrictions for selective schools so that any student in NSW could apply to attend any selective school. In 1995, the NSW government under Bob Carr created some partially selective schools (i.e. schools with both comprehensive and selective streams).

In 2010, 14 more comprehensive high schools became partially selective, with one or more classes of selective students, and a "virtual school" bringing together a single class of students from regional NSW.

 there are 47 fully or partially selective government high schools, including 17 fully selective high schools (some of which are co-educational and other provide a single-sex educational environment; 25 partially selective high schools (high schools with both selective and comprehensive classes); four selective agricultural high schools; and one virtual selective high school. Of the 47 school, 34 are located in greater metropolitan Sydney.

The Aurora College is a virtual selective high school that caters for students enrolled in government high schools in rural or remote areas in New South Wales. Virtual classes commenced in January 2015 with over 160 students. Aurora allows students in rural and remote areas to remain in their local school and community while studying specialist subjects which their home school cannot currently offer. The College uses a range of technologies to access more fast-paced lessons delivered by video and interact with each other, and attend a residential program held twice per year.

Partially selective schools

A number of schools have been designated as "partially selective", in that they have self-contained classes to provide for gifted and talented students in the junior years of high school. Often, schools combine selective and comprehensive streams as students enter the senior years, however, in practice, selective students tend to "self-select" into more advanced classes, such as extension units in Mathematics and English.

Admission and criteria

Profile score
In general, entry into a government selective school is determined by a profile score, which is derived by combining school marks in English and mathematics with the marks received in the Selective High School Placement Test in reading, writing, mathematics and general ability.

The profile score is computed by adding together with the component scores for English, mathematics and general ability, each of which are marks out of 100, to form the profile score out of 300.

 the component scores are computed as follows:
 In general ability the test marks are scaled on a statewide basis to a mean of 60 and a standard deviation of 12 to form the component general ability score out of 100.
 In mathematics, the component score is the scaled average of the scaled test mark and the moderated school mark. The raw test marks are scaled on a statewide basis to a mean of 60 and a standard deviation of 12 to form the scaled mathematics test marks out of 100. School marks are scaled on a school-by-school basis. The distribution of mathematics school marks for each school is scaled to the same mean and standard deviation, as the mean and standard deviation of the scaled test marks for students at that school. This accounts for different marking standards in different schools. A student's raw school mark, scaled according to this adjusted distribution, is the moderated school mark. The scaled test mark and the moderated school mark for each student is averaged, and the average is then re-scaled on a statewide basis to the mean of 60 and standard deviation of 12 to form the final component score out of 100.
 In English, the component score is the scaled weighted average of scaled reading and writing scores. The process follows the process used for mathematics, except that the school mark is used twice - once moderated according to reading test marks for the school and averaged with the scaled reading test score, and a second time scaled according to writing test marks for the school and averaged with the scaled writing test score. The average reading score is given a weighting of two thirds and the resultant scores for writing are given a weighting of one third. These two scores are then added and re-scaled on a statewide basis to a mean of 60 and a standard deviation of 12 to form the final component score in English out of 100.

Scaling and moderating school and tests marks ensure that:
 school and test marks have the same value;
 school marks from each school are placed on the same scale as the test marks achieved by students from those same schools thereby making it possible to fairly compare school marks from one school with school marks from each other school; and
 each component (English, mathematics and general ability) has the same value.

As For 2021, The NSW government has changed the test type to a 'Cambridge Style' Test.
This includes:
Thinking Skills: This is the predecessor of the then GA, which now has 40 questions in 40 minutes.
Mathematical Reasoning Skills: This is the predecessor of Maths, with 35 questions in 40 minutes.
Reading Skills: This is the predecessor of Reading, with 30 questions in 40 minutes.
Writing: Writing has increased to 30 minutes in time, as well as a different style in the stimulus.

The process also includes 'wild-score' processing which identifies students who, based on their school performance, may have done much worse than expected in the test. Where such students have been identified the moderating process takes this into account and adjusts scores accordingly. This ensures that students will not be disadvantaged by other students who attend the same school and may have done much worse than expected because of serious illness, misadventure or other cause.

Offers
By early July students receive letters informing them of one of three outcomes concerning their application to each school:
 offerthe student can apply immediately for enrolment in the certain school;
 reserve listthe student is placed on a waiting list, with the possibility of entry if their place on the list is reached; or
 unsuccessfulthe student will not be considered for a place.
In some cases, an application can be placed on 'hold', meaning it is awaiting the result of further enquiries by the Department of Education.

Other criteria
Other criteria include age and grade, and current residency status in Australia. This usually requires students to be between 11 years and 5 months and 13 years at the start of the year they wish to commence Year 7, be in Year 6 the year before they wish to enter, and be either a citizen or permanent resident of Australia or a citizen of New Zealand. However, exemptions to some of these requirements may be given in special circumstances or through consultation with the Department of Education.

Debate 
The existence of government selective schools in NSW, which also exist in Victoria, Queensland and Western Australia, has not been without controversy, with much of it centred on the discrepancies between selective high schools and comprehensive high schools.

A significant dismantling of the selective schools system was proposed by an inquiry in 2002 that was funded by the NSW Parents and Citizens Association and the NSW Teachers Federation. At that time, the report called for the changing of 12 of the state's 19 selective high schools to partially selective high schools, retaining only the seven most established schools: Fort Street, North Sydney Boys', North Sydney Girls', Sydney Boys', Sydney Girls', Sydney Technical, and St George Girls'. The recommendation were justified, from the viewpoint of the inquiry's chair UNSW Professor Tony Vinson, by the fact that 'wherever possible, talented students should be able to remain within mainstream schools to maximise social cohesion and "an inclusive school community"'.

However, although the report had the backing of the then NSW Education Minister John Watkins, most of the Vinson enquiry's recommendations, including most of the recommendations concerning the status of selective schools, were not implemented by the NSW Government. Another report commissioned by the Department of Education, in 2005, drew on consultation with the public across the entire state school system and found that opinions are still polarised on whether they should continue to exist.

The debate has been reignited recently due to a string of articles from The Sydney Morning Herald criticising selective schools, with the main argument purporting that they are the cause of much socio-economic divide within Sydney.

In December 2018, the then NSW Minister for Education, Rob Stokes, announced the findings of the Review of Selective Education Access that outlined changes that aim to increase the number of girls, poor and disabled students, and students stronger in English than other subjects, in selective schools. The review found that:
 The existing selection process is no longer fit for purpose and needs updating for the coming decades;
 Students from disadvantaged groups face unintended barriers to entry in the selective education system;
 Shortcomings in the assessment process mean it is not capturing all students’ true ability and so may not identify all the students it is intended to; and
 A number of gaps in the selection system constrain its effectiveness.

See also 

 List of selective high schools in New South Wales
 Magnet school
 Opportunity class
 Selective school

References

External links 
 

Selective High Schools Test

 *